Callitris monticola, commonly known as the steelhead or dwarf cypress (a name it shares with several other plants), is a species of conifer in the family Cupressaceae. It is found only in Australia, occurring in the states of Queensland and New South Wales and is considered vulnerable due to its restricted distribution.

Description 
Callitris monticola is an erect evergreen shrub growing to 2.5 meters tall. The leaves are glaucous and measure 2-4 millimeters long. This species is monoecious, with female cones occurring solitarily or in clusters. The cones are egg shaped to spherical, measuring 15-20 millimeters in diameter, with each scale having a dorsal protuberance near the apex of the cone.

References

External links
 Seed of Callitris monticola. Australian Plant Image Index, Australian National Botanic Gardens, Australian National Herbarium.

monticola
Pinales of Australia
Vulnerable flora of Australia
Nature Conservation Act rare biota
Vulnerable biota of Queensland
Rare flora of Australia
Flora of Queensland
Taxonomy articles created by Polbot

Flora of New South Wales
IUCN Red List vulnerable species